Myoxomorpha seabrai is a species of beetle in the family Cerambycidae. It was described by Marinoni and Dalossi in 1971.

References

Acanthoderini
Beetles described in 1971